Odd Arild Skonhoft (born 26 September 1973 in Norway) is a Norwegian retired footballer.

Career
He was capped 23 times for Norway as a youth international.

Skonhoft's only appearance for Scottish top flight side Raith Rovers came in the league against Dunfermline Athletic, where he picked up a yellow card, fell over the ball, and took a foul throw.

References

1973 births
Living people
Norwegian footballers
Norway youth international footballers
IK Start players
Raith Rovers F.C. players
Mandalskameratene players
Eliteserien players
Norwegian First Division players
Association football defenders
Norwegian expatriate footballers
Expatriate footballers in Scotland
Norwegian expatriate sportspeople in Scotland